This is a selected bibliography and other resources for The Holocaust, including prominent primary sources, historical studies, notable survivor accounts and autobiographies, as well as other documentation and further hypotheses.

Bibliography

Primary sources

 Gemlich letter, 1919
 Special Prosecution Book-Poland, 1937–1939
 Ringelblum Archive, 1939-1943
 The Black Book, 1940
 Theresienstadt Papers, 1941-44
 Jäger Report, 1941
 The Polish White Book, 1941
 Einsatzgruppen reports, 1941–1942
 Grojanowski Report, 1942
 Wilhelm Cornides Report, 1942
 Wannsee Conference, 1942
 Riegner Telegram, 1942
 Protest!, 1942
 Raczyński's Note, 1942
 The Black Book of Poland, 1942
 The Mass Extermination of Jews in German Occupied Poland, 1942
 Joint Declaration by Members of the United Nations, 1942
 Stroop Report, 1943
 Korherr Report, 1943
 Katzmann Report, 1943
 Höfle Telegram, 1943
 Posen speeches, 1943
 Witold's Report, 1943
 The Black Book of Polish Jewry, 1943
 Auschwitz Protocols, 1944
 Vrba–Wetzler report, 1944
 Höcker Album, 1944-45
 Gerstein Report, 1945
 Harrison Report, 1945
 Auschwitz Report, 2006

Historical studies

Selected survivor accounts 

 
 
 
 
 
 
 
 
 
 
 
 
 
 
 
 
 
 

 
 
 
 
 
 
 
 
 
 
 
 
 
 
 
  Also published as: Factory of Death; Escape from Auschwitz: I Cannot Forgive; 44070: The Conspiracy of the Twentieth Century; I Escaped from Auschwitz

Selected semi-autobiographical by survivors 
 
 
  Volume 1: My Father Bleeds History; Volume 2: Here My Troubles Began.

Other documentation

Hypotheses and historiography

Selected filmography 
America and the Holocaust The American Experience.  1994, 2005 WGBH Educational Foundation, 
Auschwitz: The Nazis and the 'Final Solution', BBC.  2005.
 Daring to Resist: Three Women Face the Holocaust is a 57-minute documentary from 1999 which tells the stories of three Jewish teenagers who resisted the Nazis: Faye Schulman, a photographer and partisan fighter in the forests of Poland (now Belarus); Barbara Rodbell, a ballerina in Amsterdam who delivered underground newspapers and secured food and transportation for Jews in hiding; and Shulamit Lack, who acquired false papers and a safe house for Jews attempting to escape from Hungary. The movie was produced and directed by Barbara Attie and Martha Goell Lubell, and narrated by Janeane Garofalo.
 Into the Arms of Strangers: Stories of the Kindertransport
 Liebe Perla is a 53-minute documentary that documents Nazi Germany's brutality towards disabled people through the exploration of a friendship between two women with dwarfism: Hannelore Witkofski of Germany and Perla Ovitz, who at the time of filming was living in Israel. Perla Ovitz was experimented on by Joseph Mengele during the Nazi regime. The film was made by Shahar Rozen in Israel and Germany in 1999, and it is in German and Hebrew with English subtitles.
Memory of the Camps, as shown by PBS Frontline
 Night and Fog, 1955, directed by Alain Resnais, narrated by Michel Bouquet.
 One Survivor Remembers is a 1995 Oscar-winning documentary (40 minutes) in which Holocaust survivor Gerda Weissmann Klein describes her six-year ordeal as a victim of Nazi cruelty.
 Paper clips
 Paragraph 175 is an 81-minute documentary directed by Rob Epstein and Jeffrey Friedman that discusses the plight of gays and lesbians during the Nazi regime using interviews with all of the known gay and lesbian survivors of this era, five gay men and one lesbian.
 Shoah is a nine-hour documentary completed by Claude Lanzmann in 1985.  The film, unlike most historical documentaries, does not feature reenactments or historical photos; instead it consists of interviews with people who were involved in various ways in the Holocaust, and visits to different places they discuss.
 The Sorrow and the Pity, 1972, directed by Marcel Ophüls.
 Swimming in Auschwitz is a 2007 documentary which interweaves the stories of six Jewish women who were imprisoned inside the Auschwitz-Birkenau concentration camp during the Holocaust. The women all survived and tell their stories in person in the documentary; at the time of its filming they were all living in Los Angeles.

External links

General sites
United States Holocaust Memorial Museum Encyclopedia of Camps and Ghettos, 1933-1945, volume 1 (First released in June 2009).
 H-HOLOCAUST, H-Net discussion list for scholars and advanced students
 Holocaust Survivors and Remembrance Project: "Forget You Not"  a Holocaust primer.
 UK Holocaust Centre Owned and run by the Aegis Trust, an independent international organisation dedicated to eliminating genocide
Resources > Holocaust. The Jewish History Resource Center, Project of the Dinur Center for Research in Jewish History at the Hebrew University of Jerusalem
United States Holocaust Memorial Museum. Includes the extensive Holocaust Encyclopedia and large collections of maps and photos, one of the most comprehensive sites.
Yad Vashem- Holocaust Martyrs' and Heroes' Remembrance Authority.  Extensive archives with searchable databases of victims, photos, extremely comprehensive
 The Ghetto Fighters' House (museum and study center in Israel) Searchable online archives on the Holocaust and Jewish resistance
The Holocaust, Crimes, Heroes And Villains.
 The Holocaust Children
 Never Again! an online memorial
The Holocaust "children's voices from beyond"
The Holocaust Chronicle. The full 800 page book online, with photos and search features.
The Holocaust Chronology (PBS)
The Holocaust History Project, General site with large Q&A section, as well as works by Jean-Claude Pressac
World Holocaust Forum "Let My People Live!"
Short Stories About the Holocaust
The Journey, by surgeon E. T. Rulison, Jr., M.D., F.A.C.S.,  first-hand account and photographs of the 51st Evacuation Hospital during World War II
"The Case of Archbishop Stepinac: How the Catholic Clergy Helped Run Ustashe (i.e., Nazi) Croatia"; Published by the Yugoslav Embassy, Washington, DC, 1947; reprinted at http://emperors-clothes.com/croatia/stepinac1.htm
Holocaust table: The partition of the 6 million figure: Holocaust with tunnel systems, bunker constructioning and Stalin deportations etc. (neutral site with the new Gorbatchev documents included)
Documents on the Holocaust at the Dwight D. Eisenhower Presidential Library
The Kindertransport A study of the kindertransport and testimonies from the children who took part in it.
The Simon Wiesenthal Center An international Jewish human rights organization
Holocaust Survivors Oral History Project at the University of South Florida
Holocaust and Genocide Studies Center at the University of South Florida
 Holocaust Centre of New Zealand

Sites in languages other than English

Yad Vashem in Hebrew, German, Farsi, Arabic, Spanish and Russian
 Project Aladdin  (Site with extensive resources in Arabic, Persian, French and Turkish)
Holocaust na terenie regionu bialskopodlaskiego w czasie II wojny światowe (Polish)

Memorials
Austrian Holocaust Memorial Service 
Beth Shalom Holocaust Centre in Newark, England 
European Holocaust Memorial 
Florida Holocaust Museum
German Government's Memorial To Jews Murdered During Holocaust
Holocaust Awareness Museum & Educational Center of Philadelphia; America's First Holocaust Museum
Holocaust Museum Houston
Imperial War Museum's Holocaust Exhibition
Montreal Holocaust Museum
 The New England Holocaust Memorial is a memorial in Boston, Massachusetts, dedicated to the Jews who were killed in the Holocaust.
 The Oregon Holocaust Memorial is an outdoor memorial in Oregon dedicated to all those killed in the Holocaust.
The United States Holocaust Memorial Museum
Virginia Holocaust Museum
Yad Vashem - The Holocaust Martyrs' and Heroes' Remembrance Authority
"Tkuma" Ukrainiane Institute for Holocaust Studies

Particular groups involved in The Holocaust
Africans in the Nazi Camps. Section from Rewriting The Footnotes — Berlin and the African Diaspora, by Paulette Reed-Anderson.
SS-Brigadeführer Franz Walter Stahlecker's "coffin map"  Estonia, Latvia, Lithuania, Belarus.
Deathly Silence: Everyday People in the Holocaust (By Plater Robinson)
The Experiences of Jewish Women in the Holocaust 
Histories, Narratives and Documents of the Roma and Sinti (Gypsies)
 Nazi Persecution of Homosexuals 1933-1945 (see also Lesbians under the Nazi regime)
 Nazi Persecution of the Disabled: Murder of "The Unfit"
Rescuers during the Holocaust

Holocaust education
An artistic portrayal of the Holocaust and its significance (Artist: Stan Lebovic) The artwork, developed for Black is a Color, is meant to depict the heroic posture humanity has assumed in this post-Holocaust world, and present it to both humanity and God. For humanity it should serve as a reminder of the worth of their actions, and for God a testament to the worth of God's creations.
The Holocaust Education Development Programme (HEDP). The Holocaust Education Development Programme (HEDP) is run by the Institute of Education (IOE), University of London and jointly funded by the Pears Foundation and the Department for Children, Schools and Families (DCSF) with support from the Holocaust Educational Trust (HET). Its overarching aim is to help teachers teach about the Holocaust in effective and thought-provoking ways.
Millersville University Annual Holocaust Conference
"Remember Our Faces"--Teaching about the Holocaust.
Belief in God After the Holocaust
Rut Matthijsen Excerpt: A Holocaust Rescuer Discusses How the Holocaust Might Best Be Taught

Victim information and databases
The Central Database of Shoah Victims' Names - Yad Vashem
Breakdown of Jewish population by country, before and after World War II
Detailed breakdown of Holocaust victim statistics
Info on victim tracing services
Links to sites listing victims and survivors from specific German communities and concentration camps
Info on archive of 128,000 victim records (currently under construction)
Info on archive of 56,000 victim records from Berlin
Online searchable database of 55,000 victim records from Berlin
Links to several online searchable victim databases
Link to searchable online victim database of 2,700 from Stutthof
Link to searchable online victim database from Augsburg
Link to searchable online victim database from Bingen
Lists of people from Gerau region noted by the Nazis for being insufficiently Aryan; Nazi murder victims listed at the bottom
Lists of Jews sent from Hamburg, organized by concentration camp
Lists of Jews sent from Hanover
Lists of Jews sent from Hattingen
Lists of victims from Hofgeismar, Kassel and Wolfhagen (Hessen)
Hohenschönhausener Victims of the Holocaust
Names of 173 Jewish victims from Kaiserslautern
List of Krefelder Jews who died in institutes, prisons or camps, or suicide during World War II
Death Lists from concentration camps near Muehldorf am Inn
Searchable list of 2300 victims from Nuremberg
List of Jews from Speyer rounded up by Nazis with notation regarding their fate

Documentation and evidence
C-SPAN BookTV: Interview with Geoffrey Megargee editor of Encyclopedia of Camps and Ghettos, 1933-1945
Detailed answers to Holocaust denial from the Nizkor Project
Documents on the Holocaust
Documentary Resources on the Nazi Genocide and its Denial
Canadian War Museum World War II Newspaper Archives - The Holocaust
Memorial to those who suffered at the eleven Kaufering concentration camps, located in the general area of Landsberg and Kaufering, Germany. 
  photos of victims, camps, liberation

Other topics
OneWorld.net's Perspectives Magazine: Preventing Genocide (April/May 2006)  - global human rights and development network looks at genocide from a variety of perspectives
 Oskar Schindler - His List Of Life 
 The Secular Word "HOLOCAUST": Scholarly Sacralization, Twentieth Century Meanings
 Chaim Yisroel Eiss the man in the center of Orthodoxy's rescue activities.

Other
Interviews from the Underground: Eyewitness accounts of Russia's Jewish resistance during World War II, a documentary film and website.
Post Holocaust Research Study focusing on Third Generation Holocaust Survivors

Album Reveals Behind-Scenes Activities at Auschwitz 
Auschwitz through the lens of the SS: Photos of Nazi leadership at the camp 
'You Have a Mother' (Jan. 2015), describing Holocaust survivor Lola Mozes' experiences as a child in Nazi camps. By Chris Hedges in Truthdig.  The Ghetto  (June 2016), Hedges interviews Lola Mozes as she recounts her experience living in Nazi-occupied Poland, three-part video interview, The Real News
Writing as Resistance  (July 2015), describing the writings of inhabitants of the Warsaw Ghetto who buried their accounts of the ghetto (in the hope it would be unearthed later) as German forces were liquidating the Jewish population of the ghetto. By Chris Hedges in Truthdig
A Liberator, But Never Free (May 2015). "A US Army doctor helped free the Dachau concentration camp in 1945, meticulously documenting his experiences in letters home to his wife. Hidden for the remainder of his life, the letters have resurfaced, and with them, questions about the G.I.'s we know only as heroes." The New Republic
 Máximo, João Carlos (2015), "Não Há Aves em Sobibor", Chiado Editora. .
Dispossession: Plundering German Jewry, 1933-1953, Jonathan Zatlin and Christoph Kreutzmüller, University of Michigan Press,ISBN 978-0472132034

See also 
 List of books about Nazi Germany
 Bibliography of World War II
 The Holocaust in popular culture
 World War II in popular culture

References

	

Holocaust historiography
Bibliographies of World War II